Macropneustidae is a family of echinoderms belonging to the order Spatangoida.

Genera:
 Archaechinus Kier, 1957
 Argopatagus A.Agassiz, 1879
 Crucibrissus Lambert, 1920
 Hypsopatagus Pomel, 1883
 Lajanaster
 Macropneustes L.Agassiz, 1847
 Phrissocystis A.Agassiz, 1898

References

Spatangoida